Jason David Danielson (born April 9, 1986), known professionally as , is an American comedian based in Japan and associated with Watanabe Entertainment. Danielson's comedic narrative is based on his confusion with kanji, ending with the punchline, "Why Japanese people?!"

Early and personal life
Danielson was born in Michigan, United States. He attended the University of Illinois at Urbana–Champaign as an engineering major and traveled to Japan for a one-year internship in 2005 to develop English speech recognition software. He earned a bachelor's degree and master's degree in computer science. In 2011, Danielson returned to Japan and formed the Japanese branch of an IT company he worked for in Chicago. Along with his career in entertainment, Danielson continues to work full-time at the IT company.

In 2007, Danielson married a Japanese woman, who he met when he first went to Japan in 2005, with their wedding ceremony held in the United States.

Career

While in Japan in 2005, Danielson became interested in Japanese comedy after watching . Two years after he returned to Japan, he attended a show held by the Japanese comedy duo , where he became acquainted with Ayumu Kato and was introduced to his agency, Watanabe Entertainment. He then trained at the agency's program, Watanabe Comedy School. Danielson's comedy routines based on his confusion with kanji, which he writes on a board behind him and ends with him yelling, "Why Japanese people?!" in English.  He initially considered focusing on political criticism like American comedians but did not feel that it would be accepted by a Japanese audience. Danielson's stage name, Atsugiri, meaning "thick-sliced" in Japanese, originated from Atsugi, where he was living at the time, and because his chest is thick.

After only four months of training, in October 2014, he made his first television appearance on R-1 Grand Prix 2015, where he attracted media attention for being the first non-Japanese finalist competing in the history of the show. Shortly after the show ended, Danielson appeared in a web-exclusive video featured as part of the advertising campaign of Nissin Foods' .

On November 8, 2015, Danielson released his first book, Nihon no Mina-san ni Otsutaeshitai 48 no Why. In February 2016, Danielson was announced as a host of the educational program Why? Programming, which was broadcast on NHK from March 21 to 25, 2016. On December 14, 2016, Danielson released his second book, Jason Shiki Eigo Training: Oboenai Eiei Tango 400. For the book's promotional event, he led an English class for 200 people, during which he stated that he was retiring his "Why Japanese people?!" catch phrase.

Filmography

Film

Television

Publications

References

External links
 

1986 births
Living people
American expatriates in Japan
Expatriate television personalities in Japan